Václav Fresl (14 October 1868, in Pelhřimov, Kingdom of Bohemia – 23 December 1915) was a Czech politician of the late-nineteenth and early twentieth centuries. He was a member of the Czech National Socialist Party from Pilsen/Plzeň and was a member of the Imperial Council in Vienna. Fresl was a close collaborator of Václav Klofáč and was infamous in Austrian parliamentary circles as a leader in the disruptions that often paralyzed the Austrian parliament. Fresl once kept the parliament from transacting its business by speaking for more than 13 hours straight, after which he had to be carried from the hall by supporters.

References 

 Bohuslav Šantruček: Václav Klofáč (1868-1928), Pohledy do života a díla (Václav Klofáč (1868-1928), His life and work), Prague, Melantrich, 1928.
 Libor Vykoupil: Jiří Stříbrný. Portrét politika. (Jiří Stříbrný. Portrait of a politician.), Brno, Masaryk University, 2003, .

1868 births
1915 deaths
People from Pelhřimov
People from the Kingdom of Bohemia
Czech National Social Party politicians
Members of the Austrian House of Deputies (1901–1907)
Members of the Austrian House of Deputies (1907–1911)
Members of the Austrian House of Deputies (1911–1918)